Composition VII is an abstract oil painting executed in 1913 by Wassily Kandinsky, a Russian-born painter. It is in the collection of the Tretyakov Gallery, Moscow. Art historians have concluded that the work is a combination of the themes of Resurrection, Judgment Day, the Flood and the Garden of Eden.

Preliminary watercolor
Kandinsky's preliminary study was his first abstract watercolor. Untitled (Study for Composition VII, Première abstraction), painted in 1913, is one of the first artworks to emerge from the representational tradition of Western European painting entirely, shedding references to well known forms, conventions of material representation and all narrative allusions.  The watercolor is the first extant entry in Wassily Kandinsky's parallel series of abstract "Compositions" and "Improvisations" that began to emerge during his Blue Rider Period. Though the work is dated 1910, art historians believe the date is apocryphal, and that Kandinsky dated the work in 1913.

Context
Kandinsky's work from the second decade of the 20th century displays a fair degree of progressive continuity away from the representational traditions of Western European art and towards pure abstraction.  His first abstract watercolor appears to be his first purely abstract work. It was thought to be the first purely "abstract painting" as abstract painting later came to be understood (as a culturally significant form, as opposed to "mere ornamentation" created as a decorative element within architecture, written works etc.). 

Contemporary with Cubism and Futurism, and the increasingly abstract work of Robert Delaunay, Francis Picabia, František Kupka, Léopold Survage, Piet Mondrian, and Hilma af Klint, Kandinsky's are generally understood as one element of a more general and distributed transition to abstraction.

See also
List of paintings by Wassily Kandinsky

References

External links 

Paintings by Wassily Kandinsky
1913 paintings
Modern paintings
Watercolor paintings
Collections of the Tretyakov Gallery